Douglas Conant is an American businessman who served as President and CEO of the Campbell Soup Company until July 31, 2011. Longtime protégé Denise Morrison, who worked for him at Nabisco as well as Campbell's, succeeded him as CEO.

Education 
A native of Chicago, Conant earned his BA degree from Northwestern University and his MBA from the JL Kellogg School of Management at Northwestern.

Business experience 
Conant worked for General Mills and Kraft Foods. He was President of Nabisco for five years prior to joining Campbell. While at Campbell, Conant led a highly successful turnaround following the layoff of much of the management team.

Under his leadership, Campbell reversed a decline in market value, improved its financial profile and enhanced its diversity and inclusion practices.

Conant was formerly the chairman of Avon Products, and is currently Founder and CEO of ConantLeadership (a growing community of people dedicated to improving the quality of leadership in the 21st century).

Publications 
He is co-author of TouchPoints: Creating Powerful Leadership Connections in the Smallest of Moments and writes a column for Harvard Business Review. His second book, The Blueprint: 6 Practical Steps to Lift Your Leadership to New Heights will be published in March 2020 by Wiley.

References

External links 
Campbell Soup Company - Executive Team - Douglas R. Conant
Official Website - Douglas R. Conant
Douglas Conant - BigSpeak.com Motivational Speaker Bio

American chief executives of food industry companies
Campbell Soup Company people
Northwestern University alumni 
Kellogg School of Management alumni
New Trier High School alumni
People from Glencoe, Illinois
Living people
Year of birth missing (living people)